The Tower Division was a liberty in the ancient county of Middlesex, England. It was also known as the Tower Hamlets, and took its name from the military obligations owed to the Constable of the Tower of London. The term ‘Hamlets’ probably referred to territorial sub-divisions of the parish of Stepney – and its daughter parishes – rather than to the usual meaning of a small village.

In contemporary terms, the Liberty covered inner East London, the area now administered by the eponymous modern London Borough of Tower Hamlets together with most of the modern London Borough of Hackney (Shoreditch and Hackney proper). The Liberty was seen as synonymous with East London until East London extended further, east of the Lea and into Essex.

The Tower Division was formed sometime in the 17th century but the much older administrative units comprising the area were united in shared military obligations long before this time. The Liberty had judicial and some local government responsibilities, and its military function was unique.

County within a county
The growth of population around the City of London led to the Ossulstone Hundred being divided into four divisions, with each division taking on the role of the hundred. The other three divisions of the hundred were named Finsbury, Holborn and Kensington.

The Tower Division was different from the other divisions in that, as well as taking on hundred responsibilities, it also took on the responsibilities – judicial, civil and military – normally exercised at county level, making the Tower Hamlets a "county within a county", comparable to the Ridings of Yorkshire.

The area had its own Justices of the Peace (JPs), appointed by the Constable of the Tower (as Lord Lieutenant), who administered both judicial and civil functions, mainly through their quarter sessions. The usual civic functions of JPs in England included:
Repair of roads and bridges
Highway diversions
Construction and maintenance of county buildings
Administration of county prisons.
Supervision of public and private lunatic asylums
Supervision of petty sessions
Licensing of public houses
Supervision of the English Poor Laws (pre-1834)
Some responsibilities around the militia
The police
Setting county rates
There is conflicting evidence around the county-level civil responsibilities exercised by the Tower Division; the extent to which the civil autonomy  mirrored the military autonomy, and for how long.
 
Unlike the other divisions, the Tower Division was outside the jurisdiction of the Lord Lieutenant of Middlesex, with the Constable of the Tower exercising lieutenancy powers, usually with the ex-officio title of Lord Lieutenant of the Tower Hamlets. This began when the right of the Constable to exact guard duty was extended in 1605 to the raising of a militia, the Tower Hamlets Militia. Counties were the principal way in which military forces were raised and the creation of the liberty and exemption from county based obligations saw East London made a distinct military unit.

The Metropolitan Board of Works was established in 1855 in order to lead on the provision of infrastructure in the capital, and this is likely to have led to a reduced responsibilities for the Tower Hamlets JPs. The area's special status ceased in 1889 with the creation of the County of London, and the creation of a Lord Lieutenant for the new county. The Tower division appears to have persisted as a magistracy area well into the 20th century.

Military function
The Tower of London was normally garrisoned by a small force of Yeoman Warders, but these were supplemented by sometimes large numbers of local Hamlets men, known as Hamleteers. The area also provided the Tower Hamlets Militia, which could be deployed in the field in the event of invasion or rebellion.

There was no peacetime standing army in England until the interregnum , and when regular units were formed they were typically raised from wider geographical districts than the Tower Hamlets; however, the area has provided some examples of regular forces.

Origins
The earliest surviving reference to the inhabitants of the Tower Hamlets having a duty to provide a guard for the Tower of London dates from 1554, during the reign of Mary I. Sir Richard Southwell and Sir Arthur Darcye were ordered by the Privy Council in that year to muster the men of the Hamlets "whiche owe their service to the Towre, and to give commaundement that they may be in aredynes for the defence of the same. This was long before the creation of the Liberty, and as the Hamlets are described as "owing" service there must have been a customary duty long before that date.

Some believe the relationship goes back to the time of the Conqueror, but others suggest it came later in the medieval period when the Hamlets had a higher population. It is thought that duty had its origin in the rights and obligations of the Manor of Stepney which once covered most or all of the Hamlets area, with the Constable of the Tower also having responsibility for the upkeep of the local part of the Thames and Lea.

Tower Hamlets units are recorded as being present at the Tilbury muster in August 1588, when Elizabeth I reviewed the English troops available to face the expected Spanish invasion. It was there that the Queen delivered her famous Tilbury address.

Size of garrison contribution
The size of the Hamleteer contribution to the Tower's garrison seems to have varied greatly. Records from 1610 show a modest 9 men per night on duty, but in 1641, a tight of great tension, 552 Hamleteers are recorded as guarding the Tower on a nine-night rota. The size of the contribution varied according to which area's men were on duty: on one evening Whitechapel provided 45 men, while on another Hackney, Bow, Bromley-by-Bow and Old Ford together provided 85.

English Civil War

Build-up to war
In the lead-up to the war, London and the eastern counties were broadly in sympathy with Parliament and against the King, with the Tower Hamlets being notably ardent in its parliamentary sympathies. This wasn't always a militant radicalism though, as evidenced when the war-weary poor of Stepney, seeking compromise with the King, partially demolished a parliamentarian strongpoint in the Lines of Communication, a ring of parliamentary fortifications around London. Despite this the support for Parliament remained generally robust throughout the coming war.

In the lead up to war, the strategic importance of the Tower, together with its money and munitions meant Charles I was careful to install a Constable of the Tower, John Byron, who was loyal to him. In Late Dec 1641 and early Jan 1642 Byron brought in stores of artillery and otherer armaments, parliament responded by putting a guard, a limited siege, using the City of London Trained Bands (the Tower Hamlets Trained Band garrisoning the Tower were separate from the City of London Trained Bands) under the popular Philip Skippon from 12th January. 

Around 20th January, the Constable (with the permission of the King) answered a summons and appeared before a House of Lords committee in Westminster to answer for his build-up of armaments. That night, with the Constable away, Skippon led a force of 500 men of the London Trained Bands under the cover of darkness, to the narrow streets of St Katharines district, by the riverside, just east of the Tower. Skippon and his men approached the Iron Gate, a small now lost feature (its site, on the east bank of the moat, is under the Tower Bridge Approach Road), outside the moat which protected a postern which opened out from the Develin Tower. The Tower was protected by a force of Hamleteers, but Skippon knew the areas political loyalties were with Parliament. Skippon believed he could seize the fortress in a coup de main by persuading the Hamleteers to let his force into the Tower, hold it and thereby transform the strategic and political situation in the capital.

Skippon called on the Sergeant on the Iron Gate to let his men through so that the Tower would fall into Parliament’s hands. The Serjeant would not let them in, and the force waited for some time in the hope that he could be talked round. The Sergeant refused a second attempt to persuade him and Skippon's force dispersed when the Constable returned from parliament just before 10pm. It seemed that the historic local bonds proved more powerful than the highly charged political affiliations of the day. Under normal circumstances Skippon would have been put on trial and executed for his actions, but Parliament swiftly exonerated him.

Before the outbreak of the first English Civil War, parliament had managed to use political pressure to get the King to install a Constable, Sir John Conyers, sympathetic to their cause. Knowing his position in London was weak, the King fled the capital before war broke out in the summer. The Tower proved an extremely valuable asset to Parliament throughout the war.

Hostilities
In the early years of the English Civil War both Parliament and the King relied on local Militias such as that of the Tower Hamlets. Generally speaking these forces were county based and very reluctant to leave their home areas. A notable few organised "Trained Bands" of more highly motivated and reliable men willing to spend more time training – Tower Hamlets had a large Trained Band ready to serve outside the Liberty and this would later be organised into two regiments.

By early 1643, the Tower Hamlets forces, together with those of Westminster and Southwark joined those of the City under the command of Sir Philip Skippon, who had previously tried to get the Tower Hamlets troops to betray the Tower to him before the start of the war. By 1644 The regiment of the Tower Hamlets is estimated to have 2-3000 men, while the strength of the reserve Yellow regiment of the Auxiliaries of the Tower Hamlets is not known.

Under Skippon's leadership, the Tower Hamlets Trained Bands saw action at Basing House (1643), Cropredy Bridge (1644), Newbridge (1644) and on their own territory, when the Yellow regiment fought at Bow Bridge in 1648.

Regimental Flag designs varied but some versions featured the Tower of London's White Tower with the Traitors' Gate watergate in the foreground. The troops wore buff sleeveless jackets to mark them out as a Trained Band, soldiers with higher status and value than ordinary Militia.

Fusiliers
In 1685, during the Monmouth Rebellion, King James II raised a force of infantry from the Tower of London garrison; the Tower Hamlets Militia. The Regiment was formed of two companies of Militia and one of miners and was known as the Ordnance Regiment and was soon renamed the Royal Fusiliers, after the fusil, the type of musket they were equipped with. The Tower Hamlets Militia helped form the Fusiliers and subsequent Tower Hamlets reserve units would come under the organisational wing of the regiment.

The regiment later became known as the 7th Regiment of Foot (Royal Fusiliers) and The Royal Fusiliers (City of London Regiment) before merging with other Fusilier regiments to form the Royal Regiment of Fusiliers in 1968. The modern regiment is headquartered at the Tower of London, where laid up Colours of the regiment are kept. The Fusiliers also maintain a museum at the Tower.

Militia and Volunteers
While most UK militia fell into disuse in the early 19th century, the Tower Hamlets Militia endured, becoming known in the late 19th century as the Tower Hamlets Militia (Queen's Own Light Infantry) and using the White Tower as its cap badge.
 
An invasion scare of 1857 saw the creation of the Volunteer Force which included both Engineer and Rifle Volunteer Corps and which in the case of the Tower Hamlets supplemented the existing militia.

These Volunteer units were raised by members of the community with the permission of their county's Lord Lieutenant, but as Tower Hamlets was effectively a 'county within a county', having its own Lord Lieutenant (the Constable of the Tower), it raised units in its own right (though in the Tower Hamlets, as elsewhere, not all units raised bore the name of their Lord Lieutenancy area).

A significant number of units were raised, a noteworthy example being the East Metropolitan RVC (11th Tower Hamlets) which was entirely made up of Jewish Volunteers. The profusion of units, some very short lived before being amalgamated or discontinued, makes the lineage of Tower Hamlets units sometimes unclear.

The Cardwell Reforms of 1871 saw the volunteer element of the armed forces re-organised and given more supervision and support from central government. The local engineer unit became known at this time as the 2nd Tower Hamlets (East London) Engineer Volunteers.

The infantry units retained their local identity but became reserve forces attached to a regular regiment, The Rifle Brigade (The Prince Consort's Own). The Militia became the 7th Battalion, the 2nd Tower Hamlets Rifle Volunteer Corps became the 9th Battalion and the 1st Tower Hamlets Rifle Volunteer Brigade (THVRB) also joined the regiment but retained its own name. In 1881 these latter two unit became part of the East London Brigade for training and mobilisation purposes but remained part of The Rifle Brigade (The Prince Consort's Own) regiment.
 
The 1st Tower Hamlets Rifle Volunteer Brigade (THVRB) used the White Tower as its cap badge at this time and used the Tower of London moat for training and drilling. Machine Gun elements of this unit were sent to the 2nd Boer War and earned a battle honour at Colenso.

In 1904 the 1st Tower Hamlets Rifle Volunteer Brigade (THVRB) was transferred from The Rifle Brigade (The Prince Consort's Own) regiment to the Royal Fusiliers a historic regiment originally formed in 1685 primarily from Tower Hamlets men.

First World War

In 1908 London's reserve infantry forces were re-organised to form a new London Regiment, though the Tower Hamlets units retained their local identities and traditions and affinities gained while attached to regular regiments. The 4th Bn Royal Fusiliers (previously the 1st Tower Hamlets Rifle Volunteer Brigade) became the 4th Bn while the 9th Bn The Rifle Brigade (The Prince Consort's Own) (previously the 2nd Tower Hamlets) became the 17th (County of London) Battalion, The London Regiment (Poplar and Stepney Rifles).

Both these units saw extensive combat in the First World War. The army's need for expansion saw the 4th (City of London) Battalion, London Regiment "duplicated" to form four battalions (1/4th, 2/4th, 3/4th and 4/4th); while the Poplar and Stepney Rifles were "duplicated" to form the 1/17th, 2/17th and 3/17th. The Tower Hamlets Engineers, by now a part of the wider Royal Engineers and retaining their local identity but not their name, was also heavily involved in the conflict.

In 1926 the Poplar and Stepney Rifles was renamed the 17th London Regiment (Tower Hamlets Rifles).

Second World War
In 1937 the London Regiment was abolished and the Tower Hamlets Rifles were transferred back to The Rifle Brigade (The Prince Consort's Own) regiment, seeing action in North Africa and Italy.

The increasing importance of aerial warfare saw the former 4th (City of London) Battalion, London Regiment being transferred to the Royal Artillery (RA) as an Anti-aircraft artillery unit, the 60th (City of London) AA Brigade, RA (TA). The unit retained its Tower Hamlets identity, if not its name, and saw action on the home front and in continental Europe.

Descendent units of the Tower Hamlets Engineers were also extensively involved in the conflict.

Cold War
After the war the Tower Hamlets units lost their identities through a series of amalgamations.

The longest to bear the local name were the Tower Hamlets Rifles who went through the Second World War as infantry. Both these Tower Hamlets Battalions (9th and 10th) of the Rifle Brigade were amalgamated to form 656th Light Anti-Aircraft Regiment, Royal Artillery (Tower Hamlets) TA in 1947 and from 1961-1967 were known as the 300th (Tower Hamlets) Light Air Defence Regiment RA (TA).

In 1967 a further amalgamation saw the loss of local identity in this last Tower Hamlets unit and the last of the Tower Hamlets name in the British Army. Some current British Army units, recruited on a much broader geographical basis, count Tower Hamlets units as part of their historic lineage.

Extent
Various historical sources list different components of the division, but its overall area remained the same. The Metropolitan Police Act 1829 enumerated the "parishes, townships, precincts and places" of the Tower Division for inclusion within the Metropolitan Police District, while the Militia (Tower Hamlets) Act 1796 specified how many men each component should supply to the division's militia.

Notes

Namesakes

Parliamentary Borough

From 1832 to 1885 there was a Parliamentary Borough named "Tower Hamlets", after the Tower Division. From 1832 to 1868 it occupied the same boundaries as the Tower Division, with the best known MP for the area being Joseph d'Aguilar Samuda, a well known shipbuilder and an officer in the 2nd Tower Hamlets Rifle Volunteer Corps. After 1868, population growth saw the constituency split in two; the southern part of the area kept the name Tower Hamlets while Hackney, Shoreditch and Bethnal Green became part of a new Hackney constituency. The southern, Tower Hamlets constituency, persisted until 1885.

Modern Borough of Tower Hamlets

The name "Tower Hamlets" was subsequently used for the modern London Borough of Tower Hamlets created in 1965 from southern areas of the Tower Division.
 
The Shoreditch and Hackney proper areas of the Tower Division together make up most of the area of the modern London Borough of Hackney.

References

External links
Map of the three divisions: Finsbury, Tower and Holborn Divisions of Ossulstone Hundred (together with the City and Liberty of Westminster later joined with the Holborn division) - note the main administrative divisions were the many parishes (not shown)
Map of the pre-19th century parishes in Tower Division

Hundreds and divisions of Middlesex
History of the London Borough of Tower Hamlets
History of local government in London (pre-1855)